Nils Gyldenstolpe may refer to:
Nils Gyldenstolpe (1642–1709), privy council president

Nils Philip Gyldenstolpe (1734–1810), count
Nils Carl Gustaf Fersen Gyldenstolpe (1886–1961), ornithologist